Swami Vivekananda Planetarium, also called Pilikula Planetarium, at Pilikula Nisargadhama in Mangalore is the first 3D planetarium in India. It is also only such planetarium in the country with hybrid modern technology innovations coupled with 3D technology of 8K digital and opto-mechanical (hybrid) projection system. It is a part of the Pilikula Nisargadhama (covering an area of ), which is also named Dr Shivaram Karanth Biological Park. It is planned and built to provide the best learning experience for students and enthusiasts on Zodiacal system of planets. Its creation is attributed to Pilikula Regional Science Centre.

History
Swami Vivekananda Planetarium is the first state-of-the-art 3D planetarium in India. However, the project overran its schedule completion, and the planetarium could be opened only on 1 March 2018. It was set up with grants from KSTePS (Karnataka Science and Technology Promotion Society) of the Karnataka government. The planetarium's objective is intended to give the viewers (students in particular and the public) to see the stars and planetary systems in the universe. Its creation is attributed to Pilikula Regional Science Centre.

The planetarium was planned and established as the first planetarium in the country with 8K digital and opto-mechanical (hybrid) projection system. Five technical persons were initially sent to Utah, USA, for training to operate the planetarium.

Technical specifications 
It has a Megastar IIA optical projector integrated with digistar and active stereo 3D 8K digital planetarium system manufactured in USA by Evans & Sutherland Computer Corporation. The projected 3 dimensional images on the screen are a part of a new level of full dome innovation. The 32 lenses of the 8K ultra-bright LED-based projector, from Ohira Tech Japan, is said to be capable of beaming "20 million stars uniformly and seamlessly over the nano-seam panels of the dome, thereby avoiding the overlapping of projected visuals."

Programmes 
The planetarium was inaugurated on 1 March 2018 and started the first public show on 2 March 2018. Eight shows are held daily with each show lasting 25 minutes. Some of the 3D shows screened are We are stars, Dawn of the space age and Mysteries of the unseen world. The shows cover space technology, planets, nature, environment science, history and geography, which are presented in English, Hindi and Kannada. The first inaugural show screened was We are stars which covers the story of space of billions of years from the time of the Big Bang to the modern day.

Access
Mangalore railway station, in the city centre, is connected to the major cities including Chennai, Mumbai and New Delhi.

Gallery

See also
 List of planetariums

References 

Planetaria
Tourist attractions in Mangalore
Planetaria in India
Science and technology in Mangalore